Thanatus striatus is a species of running crab spider in the family Philodromidae. It is found in North America, Europe, Turkey, a range from Russia (European to Far East), and Central Asia.

References

External links

 

Philodromidae
Articles created by Qbugbot
Spiders described in 1845